Brendan Whitecross (born 25 January 1990) is a former Australian rules football player who played with the Hawthorn Football Club in the Australian Football League.

Early career
He is an all round sportsman having represented his state in Athletics and is an accomplished cricketer, cross country runner, rugby union player and swimmer and Captained his schools' St Patrick's College, Shorncliffe, Brisbane Athletics Squad.

Whitecross started his football life at the Kedron Districts Junior Football Club in Brisbane, Queensland playing there for 11 seasons before moving on to the Zillmere Eagles to commence his senior career.  He represented Queensland in under 12s (2002), under 16s (2005–2006), captaining the team in 2006 and in under 18s in 2007. He was selected to the AIS/AFL Academy and travelled with the Australian under 17 team to South Africa in 2007.

AFL career

Whitecross debuted in the round 1 grand final rematch against . On 14 June 2009, Whitecross re-signed with Hawthorn Football Club for two more seasons. Whitecross closed an outstanding 2009 season at Hawthorn by winning the club's 2009 "Most Improved Player" Award. He polled 31 votes to finish 19th in the best and fairest vote-count.

By 2011, Whitecross had cemented his place in the Hawthorn line-up. It was his ability to apply pressure, to find the ball, present as a link up option going forward and uncanny goal sense that immediately made him a dangerous player. His sure hands enabled him to become an important link man as the Hawks moved the ball from the middle to the forward line.
 
Whitecross ruptured the anterior cruciate ligament in his right knee against Collingwood in the 2012 qualifying final, requiring a reconstruction.

Whitecross again ruptured the anterior cruciate ligament in his right knee against  in the 2013 preliminary final. Hawthorn went on to win the game breaking an 11 game losing streak to Geelong since 2008. His injury meant he missed the 2013 AFL Grand Final and all of the 2014 AFL season.

On 29 October 2018, Whitecross was delisted by Hawthorn.

Post AFL

Whitecross became a development coach with  but because of Covid his time was cut short because the state government banned contact sports. Whitecross was appointed coach of the Knox Football Club who compete in the Eastern Football League for seasons 2021 and 2022.

Statistics

|- style=background:#EAEAEA
| 2008 ||  || 37
| 0 || — || — || — || — || — || — || — || — || — || — || — || — || — || — || 0
|-
| 2009 ||  || 37
| 13 || 1 || 0 || 116 || 116 || 232 || 86 || 22 || 0.1 || 0.0 || 8.9 || 8.9 || 17.8 || 6.6 || 1.7 || 0
|- style=background:#EAEAEA
| 2010 ||  || 37
| 16 || 9 || 11 || 130 || 72 || 202 || 80 || 32 || 0.6 || 0.7 || 8.1 || 4.5 || 12.6 || 5.0 || 2.0 || 0
|-
| 2011 ||  || 37
| 21 || 16 || 10 || 230 || 103 || 333 || 124 || 55 || 0.8 || 0.5 || 11 || 4.9 || 15.9 || 5.9 || 2.6 || 0
|- style=background:#EAEAEA
| 2012 ||  || 37
| 22 || 9 || 9 || 293 || 144 || 437 || 135 || 57 || 0.4 || 0.4 || 13.3 || 6.5 || 19.9 || 6.1 || 2.6 || 2
|-
| 2013 ||  || 11
| 12 || 3 || 1 || 112 || 67 || 181 || 67 || 26 || 0.3 || 0.1 || 9.3 || 5.6 || 15.1 || 5.3 || 2.2 || 0
|- style=background:#EAEAEA
| 2014 ||  || 11
| 0 || — || — || — || — || — || — || — || — || — || — || — || — || — || — || 0
|-
| 2015 ||  || 11
| 4 || 0 || 0 || 23 || 21 || 44 || 19 || 5 || 0.0 || 0.0 || 5.8 || 5.3 || 11.0 || 4.8 || 1.3 || 0
|- style=background:#EAEAEA
| 2016 ||  || 11
| 9 || 2 || 1 || 73 || 83 || 156 || 58 || 19 || 0.2 || 0.1 || 8.1 || 9.2 || 17.3 || 6.4 || 2.1 || 0
|-
| 2017 ||  || 11
| 8 || 2 || 3 || 60 || 48 || 108 || 40 || 20 || 0.3 || 0.4 || 7.5 || 6.0 || 13.5 || 5.0 || 2.5 || 0
|- style=background:#EAEAEA
| 2018 ||  || 11
| 6 || 3 || 4 || 48 || 32 || 80 || 27 || 18 || 0.5 || 0.7 || 8.0 || 5.3 || 13.3 || 4.5 || 3.0 || 0
|- class="sortbottom"
! colspan=3| Career
! 111 !! 45 !! 39 !! 1085 !! 688 !! 1773 !! 636 !! 255 !! 0.4 !! 0.4 !! 9.8 !! 6.2 !! 16.0 !! 5.7 !! 2.3 !! 2
|}

Honours and achievements
Team
 2× Minor premiership: 2012, 2013
 VFL premiership player: 2018
 Minor premiership: 2015

Individual
  most improved player: 2009
 Box Hill All-Star team (1999–2019)
  life member

References

External links

Australian rules footballers from Queensland
Hawthorn Football Club players
Box Hill Football Club players
Zillmere Eagles Australian Football Club players
1990 births
Living people